Old English is a 1930 American pre-Code drama film directed by Alfred E. Green and produced by Warner Bros. The film is based on the 1924 Broadway play of the same name by John Galsworthy. The film stars George Arliss, Leon Janney, Betty Lawford and Doris Lloyd. The film had its premiere August 21, 1930 at the Warner's Theatre in Hollywood.

Synopsis
Heythorp is an old shipowner who finds himself on the verge of bankruptcy. He worries about his grandchildren, who are currently being taken care of by the miserly Mrs. Larne, the widowed wife of his son. She asks Heythorp for money, but suspecting that she will use the money on herself, he refuses. Although Heythorp is being hounded by creditors, he manages to get a loan by using some shady dealings for which he may be prosecuted. Heythorp wants to use the money for an investment, which will provide an independent allowance for his beloved grandchildren, Jock and Phyllis, which the greedy Mrs. Larne cannot touch. Although he manages to arrange everything so that he can die in peace, he is uncovered and threatened with exposure. In the end, Heythorp manages to escape punishment for his underhanded scheme.

Cast
 George Arliss as Heythorp 
 Leon Janney as Jock 
 Betty Lawford as Phyllis 
 Doris Lloyd as Mrs. Larne 
 Harrington Reynolds as Gilbert Farney
 Reginald Sheffield as Bob Pillin 
 Murray Kinnell as Charles Ventnor 
 Ivan F. Simpson as Joe Pillin
 Ethel Griffies as Adela Heythorp
 John Rogers as Budgeon - a Shareholder
 Henrietta Goodwin as Letty, the Larne's Maid

Preservation
The film survives complete and has been released by the Warner Archive on DVD. A print is preserved in the Library of Congress collection.

References

External links
 
 

1930 films
American black-and-white films
American films based on plays
Films directed by Alfred E. Green
Warner Bros. films
Films scored by Louis Silvers
1930 drama films
American drama films
1930s English-language films
1930s American films
English-language drama films